Coomera is a town and suburb in the City of Gold Coast, Queensland, Australia.

Geography
Located next to the Pacific Motorway, Coomera is close to Pimpama, Helensvale, Willow Vale, Oxenford, and Upper Coomera.  The southern boundary of Coomera is aligned with the Coomera River.

History 
Yugembah (also known as Yugumbir, Jugambel, Jugambeir, Jugumbir, Jukam, Jukamba) is one of the Australian Aboriginal languages in areas that include the Beenleigh, Beaudesert, Gold Coast, Logan, Scenic Rim, Albert River, Coolangatta, Coomera, Logan River, Pimpama, Tamborine and Tweed River Valley, within the local government boundaries of the City of Gold Coast, City of Logan, Scenic Rim Regional Council and the Tweed River Valley.

The town takes its name from the Coomera River, which in turn takes its name comes from the Yugambeh word kumera, a species of wattle. The bark of this tree was used by Aboriginal people to stupefy fish.

Coomera Provisional School opened on 11 July 1873. On 20 June 1874 it became Coomera State School. From 1877 it was known as Coomera Lower State School (sometimes Lower Coomera State School) until 1899 when it returned to the name Coomera State School.

Coomera Wesleyan Methodist Church opened on Sunday 17 May 1874. When the Methodist Church amalgamated into the Uniting Church in Australia in 1977, it became the Coomera Uniting Church. On 11 November 2017 the Uniting North Church decided to amalgamate with the Coomera Church creating the Uniting North Coomera Church.

Coomera was briefly home to a theme park and wildlife park called Koala Town which closed in the early 1990s. The site is currently occupied by residential land on Koala Town Road.

Coomera Rivers State School opened on 1 January 2011; it was originally proposed to call it Coomera East State School.

Picnic Creek State School opened in 2018.

Westfield Coomera opened on 11 October 2018.

St Joseph's College was established in January 2019 by the Brisbane Catholic Education Office with 250 students enrolled in Years Prep-4 and Year 7.

Foxwell State Secondary College opened in January 2020.

Coomera State Special School opened in February 2020.

Urban growth

Coomera has long been earmarked as a new satellite growth suburb, similar in many ways to Robina. With Australia's biggest theme park, Dreamworld and location of the Big Brother Australia house, and plans for a TAFE, a university campus and Queensland's biggest shopping centre around the existing station, Coomera has been predicted to grow considerably beyond its present size.

Coomera has seen significant residential development including Coomera Waters which is a masterplanned community encompassing a 2,500 lot harbour, canal and dry land estate over 375 hectares of land located on the northern side of the north arm of the Coomera River, directly opposite Sanctuary Cove on Hope Island.

Other residential developments currently under construction include Beacon Heights, Big Sky, Coomera Downs, Coomera Parklands Stage II, Coomera Waters, Genesis, Lily Rise and Nautical Edge.

Current real estate developments under construction or in the pipeline for the Coomera district at the beginning of 2011 have increased year on year by $400 million to total $5.9 billion.

Heritage listings 
Coomera has a heritage site:

 Coomera River: Coomera River Bridge (1930)

Population
According to the 2016 Census of Population, there were 13,305 people in Coomera
 Aboriginal and Torres Strait Islander people made up 2.5% of the population. 
 63.3% of people were born in Australia. The next most common countries of birth were New Zealand 12.0%, England 5.7%, South Africa 2.6% and Philippines 0.8%.   
 83.9% of people spoke only English at home. Other languages spoken at home included Mandarin 0.8% and Afrikaans 0.8%. 
 The most common responses for religion were No Religion 36.2%, Catholic 18.8% and Anglican 15.2%.

Education
Coomera State School is a government primary (Early Childhood-6) school for boys and girls at Dreamworld Parkway. In 2017, the school had an enrolment of 775 students with 65 teachers (58 full-time equivalent) and 31 non-teaching staff (22 full-time equivalent). It includes a special education program. The school has run the Australian Primary Schools Film Festival since 2001.

Coomera Rivers State School is a government primary (Prep-6) school for boys and girls at 81-87 Finnegan Way. In 2017, the school had an enrolment of 1372 students with 86 teachers (82 full-time equivalent) and 48 non-teaching staff (33 full-time equivalent). It includes a special education program.

Picnic Creek State School is a government primary (Prep-6) school at 25 Edwardson Drive. It includes a special education program.

Coomera State Special School is a special government primary and secondary (P-12) school at 9 Galaxy Drive. It opened in February 2020.

St Joseph's College is a Catholic primary and secondary school (Prep to Year 12).

Foxwell State Secondary College is a government secondary school, which opened in 2020.

Amenities 
The Gold Coast City Council operates a fortnightly mobile library service which visits Ragamuffin Drive near Sandy Bay.

The Coomera branch of the Queensland Country Women's Association meets at the 161 Maudsland Road in Oxenford.

Uniting North Coomera Church is at 6-8 Esplanade.

Sport and recreation 
A number of well-known sporting teams represent the local area, including the Coomera Cutters is the local rugby league club who play home games at Coomera Sports Park and the Coomera Colts Soccer Club and Coomera Magpies Australian Football Club.

The Coomera Sport and Leisure Centre, one of the Venues of the 2018 Commonwealth Games.

Climate
Coomera has a humid subtropical climate (Cfa) with hot, humid summers and mild to cool dry winters. Due to its inland location, it is slightly cooler than the coastal area of Gold Coast.

References

Further reading

External links 
 
 

Suburbs of the Gold Coast, Queensland
Towns in Queensland